Liga 1 may refer to:

 Liga 1 (Indonesia), the men's top professional division of the Indonesian football league system
 Liga 1 U-19, a junior level league of Liga 1
 Liga 1 (Peru), the Peruvian First Division
 Liga I, the Romanian First League

See also 
 1. Liga (disambiguation)
 Prva Liga (disambiguation)
 Liga (disambiguation)